Michael Bacharach was a Dayan (Rabbinic Judge) in Prague in the second half of the 18th century.

Jewish Encyclopedia bibliography 
Eisenstadt, Da'at Ḳedoshim, p. 224
Walden, Shem ha-Gedolim he-Ḥadash, i. 90
Löw, Gesammelte Schriften, ii. 263.L. G. I. Be

References 

Year of birth missing
Year of death missing
18th-century Bohemian rabbis
Judges from Prague
Rabbis from Prague